Joseph Horace Eaton (October 12, 1815 – January 20, 1896) was an American artist and a career officer in the United States Army (Regular Army). He served as a major during the American Civil War. In recognition of his service, in 1866 he was nominated and in 1867 he was confirmed for appointment to the grade of brevet brigadier general in the regular army to rank from March 13, 1865.

Early life
Eaton was born in Salem, Massachusetts. He graduated from West Point in 1835. During the Mexican–American War he was an aide to Gen. Zachary Taylor and was twice brevetted and cited for gallantry, first at the Battle of Monterey and then at the Battle of Buena Vista. Following the Mexican War, Eaton was stationed on the frontier where he painted a series of landscapes in New Mexico in the 1850s. Those paintings are highly sought after by art collectors and museums today and even Eaton's autograph is sold at auction. Among his most important watercolors are Don Fernandez de Taos and Canoncito Bonito.

Civil War
At the start of the American Civil War, Eaton was aide-de-camp and military secretary to Maj. Gen. John C. Frémont and was paymaster of the Department of Kansas. He later was stationed in Washington, D.C., where he was assistant U.S. paymaster. On December 11, 1866, President Andrew Johnson nominated Eaton for appointment to the grade of brevet brigadier general in the regular army, to rank from March 13, 1865, and the United States Senate confirmed the appointment on February 23, 1867.

Postbellum career
After the Civil War Eaton was assigned to Fort Vancouver where he was the Army's Chief Paymaster of the Department of the Columbia until his retirement in 1881. The son of Dr. Joseph Eaton, he married the former Susan Blaney in 1845. He died in Portland, Oregon, and is buried in River View Cemetery.

See also

 List of American Civil War brevet generals (Union)

Notes

References
 Eicher, John H., and David J. Eicher, Civil War High Commands. Stanford University Press, 2001. .
 American Civil War General Officers
 The Athenaum
 ArtFact.com
 AskArt.com The Artists Blue Book

External links
 
 Portland's Joseph Eaton remembered for his paintings of New Mexico
 

United States Army generals
19th-century American painters
American male painters
American landscape painters
American military personnel of the Mexican–American War
Union Army officers
United States Military Academy alumni
1815 births
1896 deaths
Burials at River View Cemetery (Portland, Oregon)
People of Oregon in the American Civil War
19th-century American male artists